San Quirino is a comune (municipality) in the Province of Pordenone in the Italian region Friuli-Venezia Giulia, located about  northwest of Trieste and about  northeast of Pordenone.

San Quirino borders the following municipalities: Aviano, Cordenons, Maniago, Montereale Valcellina, Pordenone, Roveredo in Piano, Vivaro.

References

Cities and towns in Friuli-Venezia Giulia